Northwood is a city in Worth County, Iowa, United States, along the Shell Rock River. The population was 2,072 at the time of the 2020 census. It is the county seat of Worth County.

Northwood is part of the Mason City Micropolitan Statistical Area.

History
Northwood was laid out in 1857 and platted in 1858.

Geography
Northwood's longitude and latitude coordinatesin decimal form are 43.445783, -93.219123.

Demographics

2010 census
As of the census of 2010, there were 1,989 people, 885 households, and 530 families living in the city. The racial makeup of the city was 97.3% White, 0.5% African American, 0.2% Native American, 0.1% Asian, 0.9% from other races, and 1.1% from two or more races. Hispanic or Latino of any race were 2.3% of the population.

There were 885 households, of which 25.3% had children under the age of 18 living with them, 47.5% were married couples living together, 9.3% had a female householder with no husband present, 3.2% had a male householder with no wife present, and 40.1% were non-families. 35.0% of all households were made up of individuals, and 17.1% had someone living alone who was 65 years of age or older. The average household size was 2.19 and the average family size was 2.80.

The median age in the city was 44.2 years. 21.8% of residents were under the age of 18; 6.7% were between the ages of 18 and 24; 22.4% were from 25 to 44; 27.2% were from 45 to 64; and 21.8% were 65 years of age or older. The gender makeup of the city was 48.1% male and 51.9% female.

2000 census
As of the census of 2000, there were 2,050 people, 914 households, and 549 families living in the city. The racial makeup of the city was 98.24% White, 0.10% African American, 0.10% Native American, 0.20% Asian, 0.44% from other races, and 0.93% from two or more races. Hispanic or Latino of any race were 2.39% of the population.

There were 914 households, out of which 25.8% had children under the age of 18 living with them, 47.9% were married couples living together, 8.9% had a female householder with no husband present, and 39.9% were non-families. 36.0% of all households were made up of individuals, and 20.6% had someone living alone who was 65 years of age or older. The average household size was 2.15 and the average family size was 2.76.

20.5% are under the age of 18, 7.2% from 18 to 24, 23.9% from 25 to 44, 22.4% from 45 to 64, and 26.0% who were 65 years of age or older. The median age was 44 years. For every 100 females, there were 89.5 males. For every 100 females age 18 and over, there were 84.8 males.

The median income for a household in the city was $33,030, and the median income for a family was $41,445. Males had a median income of $27,589 versus $20,637 for females. The per capita income for the city was $18,167. About 6.4% of families and 7.9% of the population were below the poverty line, including 5.8% of those under age 18 and 11.6% of those age 65 or over.

Education
The Northwood-Kensett Community School District operates local area public schools.

Climate
Humid continental climate is a climatic designation typified by large seasonal temperature differences, with warm to hot (and often humid) summers and cold (sometimes severely cold) winters. The Köppen Climate Classification subtype for this climate is "Dfb" (Hot Summer Continental Climate).

References

External links

 
Official city Web site
KYTC Radio
City-Data Comprehensive statistical data and more about Northwood

Cities in Worth County, Iowa
Cities in Iowa
County seats in Iowa
Mason City, Iowa micropolitan area